The list of shipwrecks in 1804 includes ships sunk, foundered, wrecked, grounded, or otherwise lost during 1804.

January

1 January

2 January

3 January

4 January

5 January

9 January

16 January

17 January

18 January

19 January

20 January

21 January

22 January

23 January

24 January

25 January

28 January

Unknown date

February

3 February

4 February

5 February

10 February

11 February

12 February

16 February

19 February

20 February

22 February

23 February

24 February

25 February

Unknown date

March

1 March

2 March

3 March

4 March

7 March

8 March

9 March

12 March

13 March

15 March

20 March

24 March

25 March

26 March

27 March

29 March

31 March

Unknown date

April

1 April

2 April

13 April

14 April

15 April

19 April

20 April

23 April

27 April

28 April

Unknown date

May

7 May

15 May

20 May

28 May

29 May

30 May

Unknown date

June

1 June

6 June

22 June

23 June

24 June

25 June

Unknown date

July

7 July

9 July

10 July

12 July

14 July

20 July

21 July

25 July

Unknown date

August

3 August

7 August

8 August

12 August

13 August

26 August

31 August

Unknown date

September

1 September

2 September

3 September

4 September

5 September

7 September

8 September

9 September

12 September

14 September

15 September

16 September

20 September

22 September

23 September

24 September

26 September

27 September

Unknown date

October

1 October

3 October

4 October

5 October

7 October

8 October

9 October

10 October

11 October

12 October

13 October

14 October

16 October

17 October

18 October

20 October

21 October

22 October

23 October

24 October

26 October

27 October

28 October

29 October

30 October

31 October

Unknown date

November

1 November

2 November

3 November

4 November

5 November

6 November

8 November

11 November

12 November

14 November

15 November

16 November

17 November

19 November

22 November

23 November

24 November

26 November

27 November

28 November

30 November

Unknown date

December

1 December

3 December

5 December

6 December

8 December

11 December

12 December

13 December

14 December

15 December

17 December

19 December

20 December

21 December

22 December

23 December

24 December

25 December

27 December

31 December

Unknown date

Unknown date

References

1804